Utra Janubi , is a village and one of the 51 Union Councils (administrative subdivisions) of Khushab District in the Punjab Province of Pakistan. This village gets its name from the Uttra tribe, who make the bulk of the population.

References

Union councils of Khushab District
Populated places in Khushab District